Wapen van Rotterdam was a Dutch East India Company East Indiaman that was built in 1666 for the Rotterdam Chamber of the VOC, and was operated from 1667, twice travelling to the Indies, until its capture by the English Royal Navy's frigate HMS Newcastle on 14 March 1674 in the Battle of Ronas Voe.

After its capture, it was renamed HMS Arms of Rotterdam (sometimes spelled Armes of Rotterdam) and was refitted as an unarmed hulk. In 1703 Arms of Rotterdam was broken down in Chatham.

References

Ships of the Dutch East India Company
Ships of the Royal Navy
Maritime incidents in 1674
1660s ships
Ships built in the Netherlands